National Highway 12 (NH 12), previously NH 34, is a National Highway in India which runs entirely in West Bengal. It runs from its junction with NH 27 at Dalkhola terminating at Bakkhali.

Route
NH 12 originates from its junction with NH 27 at Dalkhola in Uttar Dinajpur district and passes through Karandighi, Maharajahat Raiganj, Gazole, Malda, passes over the Farakka Barrage, Umarpur Murshidabad, Baharampur, Beldanga, Bethuadahari, Krishnanagar, Ranaghat, Barasat, Belgharia Expressway, Dankuni , Santragachi, Behala, Joka, Amtala, Diamond Harbour, Kakdwip .

Development
In 2020, widening of a stretch of 66 km from Jagulia to Krishnanagar in Nadia began.

Cities and Towns off NH 12 

 Dalkhola
 Raiganj
 Gazole
 Malda
 Sujapur
 Kaliachak 
 Farakka
 Dhuliyan
 Jangipur
 Baharampur
 Beldanga
 Bethuadahari
 Krishnanagar
 Ranaghat
 Chakdaha
 Kalyani	
 Barasat
 Madhyamgram
 Jessore Road
 Belghoria Expressway
 Dankuni
 Kona
 Alipore
 Behala
 Amtala
 Diamond Harbour
 Kulpi
 Kakdwip
 Namkhana
 Bakkhali

Toll Plazas
All of NH 12 is located within West Bengal. Below is the list of toll plazas (districtwise) from Bakkhali to Dalkhola.
South 24 Paraganas
Namkhana Bridge 
Nadia 
Bethuadahari
Murshidabad
Shibpur
Chandermore
Malda
17 Mile (Farakka Bridge)
Gazole
Districts of North 24 Paraganas & North Dinajpur do not have any toll plazas on the highway

Asian Highway Network
The highway starting from Barasat to Belghoria is part of the AH1 (Asian Highway 1) network, which starts from Tokyo, Japan and ends in Istanbul, Turkey.

See also
 List of National Highways in India by highway number
 National Highways Development Project

References

External links 

NH 12 on OpenStreetMap

AH1
National highways in India
National Highways in West Bengal
Transport in Howrah